Pilosocereus arrabidae is a species of plant in the family Cactaceae. It is endemic to Brazil.  Its natural habitats are rocky shores and sandy shores. It is threatened by habitat loss.

References 

arrabidae
Cacti of South America
Endemic flora of Brazil
Near threatened flora of South America
Taxonomy articles created by Polbot